In mathematical logic, the quantifier rank of a formula is the depth of nesting of its quantifiers. It plays an essential role in model theory.

Notice that the quantifier rank is a property of the formula itself (i.e. the expression in a language).  Thus two logically equivalent formulae can have different quantifier ranks, when they express the same thing in different ways.

Definition
Quantifier Rank of a Formula in First-order language (FO)

Let φ be a FO formula. The quantifier rank of φ, written qr(φ), is defined as
 , if φ is atomic.
 .
 .
 .

Remarks
 Relational FO[n] (without function symbols) is always of finite size, i.e. contains a finite number of formulas
 Notice that in Prenex normal form the Quantifier Rank of φ is exactly the number of quantifiers appearing in φ.

Quantifier Rank of a higher order Formula
 For Fixpoint logic, with a least fix point operator LFP:

Examples
 A sentence of quantifier rank 2:
  
 A formula of quantifier rank 1:
 
 A formula of quantifier rank 0:
 
 A sentence in prenex normal form of quantifier rank 3:
  
 A sentence, equivalent to the previous, although of quantifier rank 2:

See also
 Prenex normal form
 Ehrenfeucht game
 Quantifier

References
 .
 .

External links

 Quantifier Rank Spectrum of L-infinity-omega BA Thesis, 2000

Finite model theory
Model theory
Predicate logic
Quantifier (logic)